is a railway station in Mizuho-ku, Nagoya,  Aichi Prefecture, Japan, operated by Meitetsu.

Lines
Horita Station is served by the Meitetsu Nagoya Main Line and is 61.1 kilometers from the terminus of the line at Toyohashi Station.

Station layout
The station has two elevated island platforms with the station building underneath. Both platforms are on passing loops to allow for the passage of express trains in two tracks in between. The station has automated ticket machines, Manaca automated turnstiles and is staffed.

Platforms

Adjacent stations

Station history
Horita Station was opened on 15 April 1928 as a station on the Aichi Electric Railway. On 1 April 1935, the Aichi Electric Railway merged with the Nagoya Railroad (the forerunner of present-day Meitetsu). Ticket vending machines were  installed at this station on 16 August 1965, the first in Japan. The tracks were elevated from 1967 to 1968.

Passenger statistics
In fiscal 2017, the station was used by an average of 6,974 passengers daily.

Surrounding area
 Horita Station (Nagoya Municipal Subway)
Japan National Route 1

See also
 List of railway stations in Japan

References

External links

 Official web page 

Railway stations in Japan opened in 1928
Railway stations in Aichi Prefecture
Stations of Nagoya Railroad
Railway stations in Nagoya